The seventh season of the Brazilian competitive reality television series MasterChef  premiered on July 14, 2020 at 10:45 p.m. on Band.

The season was originally set to premiere on May, however, due to the impacts of the COVID-19 pandemic, filming was postponed to June 20, 2020 under a new format. Unlike the standard format, this season, each week new amateur chefs compete in a series of tests to secure a place in the final and a chance to win the grand prize and the MasterChef trophy.

First stage winners were awarded a R$5.000 prize courtesy by PicPay, an Amazon Echo device, a R$500 shop card at Amazon.com, an oven from the new Brastemp Gourmand line, a Tramontina kit of pots and knives, a scholarship at Estácio de Sá University and a reduced new version of the program trophy.

On July 2, Band announced that filming had been suspended until July 6, 2020. Taping for the first stage was completed on August 28, 2020. Shooting for the final resumed in November 2020.

The final winner was awarded a R$25.000 prize, a house equipped by Amazon Echo smart devices, a Brastemp Inverse 4 refrigerator, a new kitchen equipped by Tramontina and the MasterChef trophy.

Architect Anna Paula Nico won the competition over app driver Hailton Arruda and systems analyst Heitor Cardoso on December 29, 2020.

First stage

Top 184

Elimination table

Episodes 1–8

Episodes 9–16

Episodes 17–24

Key

Final stage

Top 24

Elimination table

Episode 25

Key

Ratings and reception

Brazilian ratings

All numbers are in points and provided by Kantar Ibope Media.

References

External links
 MasterChef on Band

2020 Brazilian television seasons
MasterChef (Brazilian TV series)
Television productions postponed due to the COVID-19 pandemic